The Antigua Workers' Union (AWU) or (ABWU) is a national trade union centre of Antigua and Barbuda. It was formed in 1967 after a split from the ATLU. The AWU created the Progressive Labour Movement (UPP) in 1970.

The AWU is led by Senator David Massiah as general secretary. Senator Chester Hughes is president of the union.

The first president of the Antigua Workers' Union was Malcolm Daniel.

See also

 List of trade unions

References

External links
 www.icftu.org entry in ITUC address book.

Trade Union Confederation of the Americas
Trade unions in Antigua and Barbuda
Trade unions established in 1967